Russell is a home rule-class city on the south bank of the Ohio River in Greenup County, Kentucky, United States. The population was 3,380 as of the 2010 census, down from 3,645 in 2000. Russell is a suburb of Ashland and part of the Huntington-Ashland-Ironton metropolitan area. It has close economic affiliations with its neighbors, Ashland and Flatwoods in Kentucky and Ironton, Ohio.

History
The hilly site near the confluence of White Oak Creek and the Ohio was chosen by pioneer Jeff Moore in 1823 in order to provide protection for his camp against attacks by local American Indian tribes. In 1829, James E. McDowell, William Lindsay Poage, and his brother erected an iron furnace; they named the foundry and the community that grew up around it "Amanda Furnace" after William's infant daughter. The furnace ceased operation in 1861.

John Russell and his Means and Russell Iron Company purchased the land of the present city beside Amanda Hill from the Poage brothers. They laid out and established the town of Riverview in 1869 in expectation of an expansion of the Chesapeake and Ohio Railroad westward from Huntington, West Virginia, to Cincinnati, Ohio. Ferry service to Ohio began in 1870, local landowners agreed to rename the community after its founder in 1873, and the city was formally incorporated under the name "Russell" in 1874. The expected C&O spur did not arrive until 1889 but, when it did, it constructed a railyard, roundhouse, and shops and the city grew quickly. The city celebrates this influence with the annual "Russell Railroad Days" each August.

Numerous disasters limited the city's growth. The Ohio River flooded the city in 1884, smallpox struck in 1901, and a fire consumed downtown and the city hall in 1903. In 1905, it was still the largest city in Greenup County, but the Ohio flooded again in 1913 and 1937. The 1937 flood affected all but 30 homes, and over 500 people were forced to shelter in C&O boxcars and cabooses until the waters receded. Despite the completion of a bridge to Ironton in 1922 and a floodwall in 1950, Russell was no longer the county's largest municipality by the mid-1950s.

The Fortune 500 company Ashland Oil relocated its headquarters to Russell in 1974, but moved to the Cincinnati suburb of Covington in 1999.

Geography
Russell is located in the eastern corner of Greenup County at  (38.518176, -82.697680), directly across the Ohio River from Ironton, Ohio. It is bordered to the northwest by the city of Worthington, to the west by the city of Flatwoods, and to the south by the city of Bellefonte. The southeast border of Russell is the Boyd County line, separating Russell from the unincorporated community of Westwood.

Demographics

As of the census of 2000, there were 3,645 people, 1,428 households, and 1,106 families residing in the city. The racial makeup of the city was 96.49% White, 0.71% African American, 0.03% Native American, 2.14% Asian, 0.22% from other races, and 0.41% from two or more races. Hispanic or Latino people of any race were 0.82% of the population.

There were 1,428 households, out of which 30.0% had children under the age of 18 living with them, 67.6% were married couples living together, 7.1% had a female householder with no husband present, and 22.5% were non-families. 20.2% of all households were made up of individuals, and 8.9% had someone living alone who was 65 years of age or older. The average household size was 2.50 and the average family size was 2.88.

In the city the population was spread out, with 21.7% under the age of 18, 7.1% from 18 to 24, 25.1% from 25 to 44, 29.7% from 45 to 64, and 16.4% who were 65 years of age or older. The median age was 43 years. For every 100 females, there were 94.6 males. For every 100 females age 18 and over, there were 91.5 males.

The median income for a household in the city was $53,869, and the median income for a family was $62,018. Males had a median income of $50,306 versus $30,494 for females. The per capita income for the city was $29,453. About 4.1% of families and 6.0% of the population were below the poverty line, including 11.1% of those under age 18 and 2.1% of those age 65 or over.

Economy

Industrial
Part of AK Steel's Ashland Works is located in Russell. Russell was also once home to the headquarters of Ashland Global, a diversified chemical company. The two-building headquarters was located on Kentucky Route 1725 (Ashland Drive), with another facility on KY 693 (Diederich Boulevard). The company has since relocated to Covington. One of the buildings was purchased by Our Lady of Bellefonte Hospital and was known as Bellefonte Pavilion during the hospital's ownership. That building is now owned by Ashland-based King's Daughters Medical Center, has been renamed King's Daughters Pavilion and houses many of the hospital's business offices. The other building, which was named Bellefonte Centre, is privately owned and is used as physician and clinic offices along with rental office space.

Transportation
The city has a large railroad classification yard, built by the Chesapeake & Ohio Railroad and now owned and operated by CSX Transportation. The C&O Rail Yard was formerly the largest individually-owned rail yard in the world.

Vehicles may cross the Ohio River via the Ironton–Russell Bridge or the Ben Williamson Memorial Bridge in Ashland. A new Ironton-Russell Bridge, opened in 2016, connects downtown Ironton with U.S. 23 and KY 244 just south of downtown Russell. The original Ironton-Russell Bridge, which connected downtown Ironton directly with Willow Street in downtown Russell, opened in 1922, closed when the new bridge opened in 2016 and was demolished in late 2016–early 2017.

Medical
Our Lady of Bellefonte Hospital was a 214-bed not-for-profit acute care hospital located in Russell from 1953-2020. The hospital was part of the Catholic-based Bon Secours Health System Inc. Our Lady of Bellefonte Hospital employed approximately 1,200 healthcare professionals, making the hospital the largest employer in Greenup County when it was open.

Education
Russell's students are served by Russell Independent Schools, which it shares with its neighbors, Flatwoods and Bellefonte. The main campus, which includes Russell High School, Russell Middle School, Russell Primary School and the Russell Area Technology Center, sits on the Russell/Flatwoods city line (all of the schools' mailing addresses are Russell, but they receive primary police and fire protection from Flatwoods).

The Russell High School football field is home to a fire-breathing Red Devil, the school's mascot Rudy, who sits atop the scoreboard.  Russell High School was the 1978 Kentucky State 3A football champion, as well as the 2005 Kentucky State 2A football champion.

Notable people
 Billy Ray Cyrus, Country Music Star
 Charlie Honaker, professional football player
 Bill McCutcheon, Emmy and Tony award-winning actor
 Amanda Noelle, Christian musician and worship leader
 Ernest E. West, recipient of the Medal of Honor for his actions in the Korean War

See also
 List of cities and towns along the Ohio River

References

External links
 City of Russell official website
 Ashland Alliance, regional Chamber of Commerce
 Russell Independent School District
 Greenup County Tourism Commission

 

Cities in Greenup County, Kentucky
Kentucky populated places on the Ohio River
Populated places established in 1869
1869 establishments in Kentucky
Cities in Kentucky